Ingmanthorpe may refer to:
Ingmanthorpe, Derbyshire, England
Ingmanthorpe, North Yorkshire, England